Lowell Newton Galloway (July 7, 1921 – February 11, 1979) was an American professional basketball player. He played for the Indianapolis Kautskys in the National Basketball League and averaged 1.7 points per game during 1946–47. He played college basketball at the University of Evansville.

After his professional career ended, Galloway went into coaching and teaching. He died from a stroke in 1979.

References

1921 births
1979 deaths
American men's basketball players
Basketball players from Indiana
Basketball players from Kentucky
Centers (basketball)
Evansville Purple Aces men's basketball players
Forwards (basketball)
High school basketball coaches in Indiana
High school football coaches in Indiana
Indianapolis Kautskys players
Sportspeople from Evansville, Indiana